Detroit International Academy for Young Women (DIA) is a PK-12 school in Detroit, Michigan. It is Michigan's sole public girls' school, located in the former Northern High School.

The school mascot is The Pink Panther.

History
The school opened in a building on Woodward Avenue in 2005. Its location is the former Northern High School building. At the time it opened, the school had 78 students. The school changed into an all girls' school after July 2006, when the Michigan Legislature passed a bill permitting the establishment of all girls' and boys' public schools. In its first year of being a girls' school there were 95 students in grades 9-10. It moved into its current location in the fall of 2007. In 2008 there were about 400 girls attending the school. Originally a high school, it began middle school classes around 2009, and around 2010 it began elementary classes. That year there were 530 students. In 2014, 502 girls were registered at the school.

In 2015 the school began holding white dress graduations instead of the usual cap and gown graduations. Several of the dresses were donated since most of the students receive free or reduced school lunches, a mark of having low income. Many private girls' schools in the United States use white dress graduations. 60 girls graduated during the 2015 ceremony.

Student body
As of April 2015, African-Americans comprise 86% of the student body. The second largest demographic is Asians, at 5%. 82% of students are designated as economically disadvantaged. Most students qualify for a free or reduced-price lunch.

Students include African-Americans, Bangladeshis, Hispanics and Latinos, and Whites. DPS stated that the school has a "strong tie to the Bangladeshi community." Principal Beverly Hibbler stated that the all-female environment was attractive to persons in the Bangladeshi culture. In 2010 about 45-50 students were Bangladeshi.

Persons living outside of the DPS district are allowed to attend DIA. As of 2010 some students reside in suburbs outside of Detroit; their parents typically work around Downtown Detroit and the students go to and from school using their own transportation.

See also
 Douglass Academy for Young Men - A public all boys' school in Detroit

References

Further reading
 Pritchett, Aujhante. "Seniors fall out at Detroit International Academy." Detroit Free Press. December 18, 2013.
 "Inside Detroit Public Schools » Detroit International Academy." Detroit Public Schools. October 6, 2008.

External links
 Detroit International Academy for Young Women
 

High schools in Detroit
Girls' schools in Michigan
Public girls' schools in the United States
2005 establishments in Michigan
Educational institutions established in 2005
Magnet schools in Michigan
Bangladeshi-American culture
Public K-12 schools in Michigan
Detroit Public Schools Community District